Andrés Guðmundsson (born 17 April 1965) is a prominent former international strongman competitor and Highland Games competitor, and former holder of the World Strongman Challenge title.

Biography
Andrés Guðmundsson began his career in sport in the world of track and field athletics. After turning his attention to professional sport he became involved in strength athletics. His time in strength athletics coincided with the careers of fellow Icelandic strongmen Jón Páll Sigmarsson and Magnús Ver Magnússon and thus to an extent was overshadowed by their careers. His competition experience ranged from volleyball, discus and shot put to the traditional Scottish Highland Games. His discus career resulted in him being in fourteenth place on the Icelandic all-time list with a throw of 53m (in Reykjavík for the Ármann club on 3 September 1991). In 1994 he was also ranked as Iceland's number 2 shot putter (and 87th in the world) with a put of 18.63 meters.

Strength athletics
In 1994 he reached the peak of his strength athletics career, winning the World Strongman Challenge, European Hercules and coming second in the European Muscle Power Championships. Both the European Musclepower Championships and the Highland Games World Championships were held on a weekend on the same field in Callander, Scotland. At this time, he was widely regarded as one of the top dual threats in Highland Games and strongman competition, but was sidelined by a career threatening injury, a tear of his pectoral muscle.

For a while this looked to have been a career-ending injury in and Andrés began focusing his experience in other directions. He opted to share his experience with Icelandic fitness people and emerging strongmen, and as a result developed Skólahreysti (School Fitness) together with his wife Lára Helgadóttir, which quickly became one of the most popular and well known school sporting events in Iceland.

In 1999, he looked to be making a comeback. He was reported to have won Iceland's Strongest Man competition in 1999. In August 1999 he had a podium finish in the Bison Highland Games and in 2000 he was added to the list of competitors for the IFSA Helsinki Grand Prix 2000. Despite a top international field such was his reputation that he was placed 5th in the betting to win, so soon after his comeback began. However, a recurrence of the pec tear forced him to pull out.

Skólahreysti
The Helsinki Grand Prix in 2000 was his last major international competition and from that point on he focused almost entirely on the Skólahreysti project. The first Skólahreysti contest was held in 2005 with six schools participating. Its goal was to encourage children to take part in a wide-ranging sports experience based on the criteria used in their general physical education. The 2009 season saw 110 schools participate with the final broadcast live by RÚV, and audience surveys showed that around 49% of Icelanders tuned in.

Personal life
Andrés has two sons who play football, Axel Óskar Andrésson and Jökull Andrésson.

References

Icelandic strength athletes
Icelandic male shot putters
Icelandic male discus throwers
Living people
1965 births